Dawat University is a private university registered with the government of Afghanistan. Established in 2009,  Dawat University is a non-profit private higher-education institution located in the urban setting of the metropolis of Kabul (population range of 1,000,000-5,000,000 inhabitants).

Abdul Rab Rasul Sayyaf, the founder, recently obtained a license from the Ministry of Higher Education. In the beginning, Dawat University will be registering students to the faculties of Engineering, Law and Islamic Studies. In 2013 it has about 7000 students studying in six faculties, Shariah, Law, Engineering, Economics, Journalism and Pharmacy; the first batch of 450 students are graduated in this year.

Overview 
This institution also has a branch campus in Khost. Officially recognized by the Ministry of Higher Education of Afghanistan, Dawat University is a very small (uniRank enrollment range: 500-999 students) coeducational Afghan higher education institution.

Divisions 

 Economics Faculty
 Engineering Faculty
 Journalism Faculty
 Law and Political Sciences Faculty
 Medicine for Ladies Faculty
 Pharmacy Faculty
 Sharia Faculty

See also 
List of universities in Afghanistan

References

External links 
Dawat University obtains a license
Ministry of Higher Education - Afghanistan
Dawat University - Official fan page

Universities in Afghanistan
Universities and colleges in Kabul
Educational institutions established in 2009
2009 establishments in Afghanistan
Private universities in Afghanistan